Dombey may refer to:

Dombey, West Virginia, an unincorporated community in Wood County
Joseph Dombey, a French botanist

See also
Dombey and Son, a novel by Charles Dickens